Black Dawn may refer to:

 Black Dawn (album), a 2016 album by Cactus
Black Dawn (film), a 2005 film starring Steven Seagal
Black Dawn (video game), a PlayStation and Sega Saturn video game
 Black Dawn (1993 video game), a 1993 game for the Amiga personal computer; see 
Black Dawn, the seventh novel in the Night World series by L.J. Smith
The Black Dawn, a science fiction multimedia experience produced by New Renaissance Pictures

See also
 Blackdown (disambiguation)